Hohenlohe-Jagstberg was a Principality located in northeastern Baden-Württemberg, Germany, around Jagstberg which had been a territory of the Bishopric of Würzburg. It was ruled by one of the lines of the House of Hohenlohe. Hohenlohe-Jagstberg was a partition of Hohenlohe-Bartenstein and was mediatised to Württemberg in 1806.

Prince of Hohenlohe-Jagstberg (1798–1806)
Charles Joseph (1798–1806)

Prince of Hohenlohe-Jagstberg (New, 1906)  

  Albrecht, 1st Prince 1906-1996 (1906-1996)
  Alexander, 2nd Prince 1996-present (b.1940) 
  Karl, Hereditary Prince of Hohenlohe-Jagstberg (b.1967)
  Prince Carlos (b.2007)

References 

Principalities of the Holy Roman Empire